Peter Godfrey may refer to:

Peter Godfrey (MP) (1665–1724), British merchant and politician
Peter Godfrey (director) (1899–1970), English-American actor and theatre/film/television director
Peter Godfrey (footballer, born 1938), English football outside right
Peter Godfrey (footballer, born 1957), Scottish football central defender

See also

Godfrey (name)